Saint Stanislaus church is a Roman Catholic Church (RCC) in Chortkiv of the Chortkiv urban hromada of the Chortkiv Raion of the Ternopil Oblast.

History 
On February 22, 1610, the Rus' voivode and owner of the town Stanislav Holskyi brought to Chortkiv oo. Dominicans and founded a church and monastery for them. The first church was built together with the monastery. Dominicans in 1619. After his death, the founder was buried in the crypt of the church. The temple was visited by Polish kings, including Jan II Casimir (in 1663) or Jan III Sobieski (in 1673).

The church of the 18th century turned out to be too small for parishioners, so at the turn of the 19th/20th century it was decided to build a new (current) church in its place (after dismantling the old one). Construction was completed in 1918. It is made in the Gothic style "Vistula" designed by Polish architect Jan Sas Zubrzycki. The authors of the figures of saints were Czeslaw Stovp and Damian Stankievych.

In 1941, Soviet troops, fleeing to the east, set fire to the church and monastery, destroying the building.

After the end of World War II and the departure of Poles from the local lands, the Soviet authorities closed the church and set up a fertilizer warehouse, and valuable Dresden organs inside were destroyed (later the Dresden authorities wanted to buy them back, but it was too late). The church was handed over to the Dominican Fathers in a ruined state in 1989. The first pastor (after the Second World War) was Father Reginald Vyshnevskyi from Chortkiv.

Until the end of the Second World War, the church kept a painting of the Chortkiv Mother of God (Rosary), which was presented to the Dominicans in the XVII century by King Jan Casimir. It was saved from destruction by former Polish parishioners, who forcibly moved the painting to the new borders of Poland, and in the 1980s placed it in the Warsaw church. street Jacek, where he remains to this day. Today, a crowned copy of the painting is kept in the church in Chortkiv.

In 2019, at the 40-meter height of the tower of the Saint Stanislaus church in Chortkiv, archaeologist, researcher of fortifications and antiquities Volodymyr Dobrianskyi discovered a detonator of a shrapnel projectile, according to its flight trajectory determined that the 1st, 3rd, 4th and 7th cannon regiments (64 guns) under the command of Ataman Kirill Karas during the Chortkiv offensive (June 7–28, 1919) were stationed in the woods west of the village of Shmankivtsi in the Chortkiv district.

References

External links 
 

Churches in Chortkiv